Kenmare Parish  is a remote civil Parish, of Irrara County, a cadasteral division of New South Wales.

Geography
The parish is located at 29°21′51″S 144°56′31″E in Bourke Shire.
 
The topography of the area is flat and arid with a Köppen climate classification of BSh (Hot semi arid).

The economy in the parish is based on broad acre agriculture, mainly Cattle, and sheep. Much of the parish is covered by Yantabulla Swamp The only settlement near the parish is the ghost town of Yantabulla, New South Wales with Hungerford, Queensland to the north the nearest town by road.

Kenmare parish, Irrara County will be the site of a Total Solar Eclipse on 22 July 2028.

See also
Irrara County

References

Localities in New South Wales
Geography of New South Wales
Far West (New South Wales)